The World Scout Youth Forum provides an opportunity for young members of World Scouting to discuss and express their views on issues of interest to them. Through preparing inputs and making recommendations to the World Scout Conference and to the World Scout Committee, to which the Forum is linked, participants will develop the skills necessary to strengthen their capacity to take part in decision-making processes. It is one of the most important events of the WOSM.

Each National Scout Organization is invited to send a delegation to the World Scout Youth Forum. Only individuals who are members of WOSM can be delegates to the World Scout Youth Forum. The participants must be between their 18th and 26th birthdays in the year of the Forum.

Background
The World Scout Youth Forum (WSYF) is an educational tool to support the process of developing youth participation in partnership with adults for young members in the oldest age sections.

Each National Scout Association can send up to two delegates and three observers; therefore, the maximum number of participants on a delegation is five.

According to Resolution 6/02 on Youth Involvement in Decision-Making of the World Scout Conference, the WSYF shall be to enable young people to reach three different aims, which are 1. share their ideas and experiences on current issues affecting young people in different parts of the world; 2. suggest ways of strengthening national youth policies and training young people for world citizenship; and 3. contribute new ideas to the Movement on how to enrich educational programs for young people over 16.

Delegates and observers
Delegates and Observers for the Forum should be included in the appropriate form returned to the World Scout Bureau in advance of the event. If this is not completed before registration, each Delegate and Observer will be required to produce an official letter of appointment clearly indicating the function of either Delegate or Observer, signed by the President, International Commissioner or other responsible official of his or her National Scout Organization.

Youth Advisors to the World Scout Committee
The World Scout Committee referring to Strategic Priority Number 1 "Youth Involvement"; and Resolution 11/05 World Scout Youth Forum, adopted at the 37th World Scout Conference. The role of the Youth Advisors are to increasing youth participation in decision making and strengthening youth involvement within the Scout Movement is a key issue for the World Scout Committee. The system of Youth Advisors has been created in the spirit of strengthening youth participation in World Scouting, and is considered as an interim measure in achieving that goal. The Youth Advisors have the responsibility to individually work for WOSM as a whole – not only the young members of the organization – however the Youth Advisors elected at the World Scout Youth Forum have a responsibility towards their constituency.

The Youth Advisors to the World Scout Committee are elected in the World Scout Youth Forum to assist and to advise the World Scout Committee in the perspective of youth. All the participants of the World Scout Youth Forum are able to run for the election, while only one candidate can be nominated by each NSO. Totally six Youth Advisors will be elected and they will be able to join the meeting of the World Scout Committee and all the meeting of the next World Scout Youth Forum Planning Committee meeting.

Listing of events

References